Wardha District (Marathi pronunciation: [ʋəɾd̪ʰaː]) is in the state of Maharashtra in western India. This district is a part of Nagpur Division. The city of Wardha is the administrative headquarter of the district. Hinganghat, Pulgaon, Arvi and Wardha are the major cities in the District. The District had a population of 1,300,774, of which 26.28% were urban as of 2011.

History
The history of the Wardha district dates back to ancient times. It was included in the empires of the Mauryas, Shungas, Satavahanas and Vakatakas. Pravarpur, now modern-day Pavnar, was once the capital of the Vakataka dynasty. Vakatakas were contemporaries of the Imperial Guptas. The daughter of Chandragupta II, Prabhavatigupta, was married to the Vakataka ruler Rudrasena II. The Vakataka Dynasty lasted from the 2nd to the 5th centuries AD. Their state stretched from the Arabian Sea in the west to The Bay of Bengal in the east and from The Narmada River in the north to The Krishna-Godavari Delta in the south.

Later on, Wardha was ruled by the Chalukyas, The Rashtrakutas, The Yadavas, The Delhi Sultanate, The Bahamani Sultanate, The Muslim ruler of Berar, The Gonds and The Marathas. Raja Buland Shah of Gond and Raghuji of Bhonsale were the prominent rulers in the medieval period.

Ashti town in Wardha district was ruled by the Mughals in the guidance of Nawab Muhammad Khan Niazi who was Subedar and Mansabdar in the Mughal empire in the reign of Emperor Akbar he got Ashti as a Jaageer. Nawab Ahmad Khan Niazi was the elder son of Nawab Muhammad Khan Niazi who also served as Mansabdar and Jagirdar in the Mughal court in the reign of Emperor Jahangir he got Ashti as Pergana as his ancestral property. Ahmad Khan Niazi defeated Rahim Khan Dakhni and captured Ellichpur from the Berar empire for the Mughals.

In the 1850s, Wardha, then a part of Nagpur, fell into the hands of the British. They included Wardha in the Central Province. Wardha is a sister city for Sevagram and both were used as major centers for the Indian Independence Movement, especially as headquarters for an annual meet of the Indian National Congress in 1934 and Mahatma Gandhi's Ashram.

The existing Wardha district was a part of Nagpur district till 1862. Further, it was separated for convenient administrative purposes and Kawatha near Pulgaon was the district headquarters. In the year 1866, the district headquarters moved to Palakwadi village which was rebuilt as Wardha city.

Central Ammunition Depot in Pulgaon city of Wardha District is the second-largest ammunition depot in Asia.

Demographics
According to the 2011 census, Wardha district has a population of 1,300,774, roughly equal to the nation of Mauritius or the US state of New Hampshire. This gives it a ranking of 377th in India (out of a total of 640). Its population growth rate over the decade 2001-2011 was 4.8%. Wardha has a sex ratio of 946 females for every 1000 males, and a literacy rate of 87.22%. Scheduled Castes and Scheduled Tribes make up 14.52% and 11.49% of the population respectively.

At the time of the 2011 Census of India, 87.78% of the population in the district spoke Marathi, 6.88% Hindi and 1.26% Urdu as their first language.

Politics
Lok Sabha Seat
Wardha = Ramdas Tadas (BJP)

Assembly Seats
Wardha = Dr. Pankaj Rajesh Bhoyar (BJP)
Deoli = Ranjit Kamble (INC)
Arvi = Dadarao Keche (BJP)
Hinganghat = Samir Trambakrao Kunawar (BJP)

Prominent people

 Abdul Shafee, Senior Politician of Indian National Congress
 Baba Amte, India's Social and moral leader (born 24 December 1914 ) at Hinganghat
 Vinoba Bhave, Freedom fighter and social worker
 Jamnalal Bajaj, Freedom Fighter
 Abhay and Rani Bang, Social Workers, rendering medical services to the poor adiwasi people of Gadchiroli district.
 Dr. Rajat Kinhekar
 Sindhutai Sapkal, A Social Activist and Social Worker, working for orphans.

References

External links

Wardha district website
Wardha Zilla Parishad

 
Districts of Maharashtra
1862 establishments in India
Vidarbha